Science fiction authors have designed imaginary spacesuits for their characters almost since the beginning of fiction set in space.

Often, comic book creators seem unaware of the effects of internal pressure which tends to inflate a spacesuit in vacuum, and draw their imaginary spacesuits as hanging in folds like a boilersuit; this can often be seen in the Dan Dare stories, where the artist often drew from actual or photographed posed actors. Many space story writers merely mention a "spacesuit" without considering or describing design details, in the same way as they mention a raygun or a spaceship without considering how its mechanism would work.

The breathing apparatus which is part of the Primary Life Support System of real space suits is always a rebreather type system. However, in illustrations in fiction such as comics, a spacesuit's life support system is often largely composed of two big backpack cylinders, as if it was open circuit; at least one fictional scenario has liquid breathing spacesuits.

Early concepts

Edison's Conquest of Mars

From Edison's Conquest of Mars (1898):

This illustration of the suit appears to be skintight (note the wrinkles), and to have a soft hood with a built-in fullface mask, rather than a hard helmet, although according to the story the suits had helmets.

This common early idea for a spacesuit would have not worked in reality for several reasons:
The suits have no constant volume joints to prevent the suits from ballooning under their interior pressure.
The suits have no gloves.
The rubberized material of a diving suit would have quickly become brittle due to loss of volatiles in space vacuum; and also due to cold making the rubber brittle when out of sunlight, if they radiate heat away faster than the spaceman's body heat warms them.

Skintight spacesuits (skinsuits) appear in the original Buck Rogers comics published from 1928 on. This comic was so popular that expressions such as "Buck Rogers outfit" for real protective suits that look somewhat like spacesuits entered common usage.

With the rise of the Science fiction pulp magazines in the 1920s many depictions of imaginary spacesuits were created from scratch by artists such as Frank R. Paul, often appearing on the covers of the magazines. Very often these artists' creations were absurd, with such errors as a helmet whose neck hole is too narrow for the head to get through.

Often fictional spacesuits are drawn with two large backpack cylinders as their only life-support gear, as if the exhaled gas is vented to space as in an ordinary open-circuit scuba set.

The Lensman series by E.E. "Doc" Smith features armored spacesuits used in hand-to-hand combat.  Some especially heavily armored spacesuits in the series use motors to help the wearer move about.

After World War II
Following World War II, fictional spacesuits were influenced both by the real life pressure suits and G-suits which had seen use during the war for high-altitude aviation and also by the speculative articles on space travel which were published in magazines like the Saturday Evening Post and Collier's Weekly by such space pioneers as Wernher von Braun and Willy Ley and which featured carefully considered spacesuit designs.

In films
Some early space travel fiction films showed characters in spacesuits much more often than Star Trek and afterwards.

The First Men in the Moon

In H.G. Wells's original novel, The First Men in the Moon, published in 1901, the Moon has a breathable atmosphere during its two-week-long day and spacesuits are not needed; the spacecraft has an airtight hatch, but no airlock.

In the film version, made in 1964, the Moon has no atmosphere and no surface vegetation. Two types of spacesuits are featured.
 During the events of the story which take place in the 1890s, standard diving dresses, each fitted with a 1960s type aqualung cylinder worn on the back, are used as spacesuits. No provision is made to prevent the suits from ballooning in the vacuum, or to protect the hands from the vacuum.
 The film depicts the 1960s astronaut spacesuits as close copies of a British high-altitude pressure suit of the sort intended to be used aboard the TSR-1 and fitted with a 1960s-type aqualung cylinder instead of the NASA-type life support backpack which came into common usage a few years after the movie was made.

Dan Dare
In the Dan Dare comic series, which started in April 1950 in the "Eagle" comic, the standard Spacefleet spacesuit had no backpack, had a corselet as per Standard Diving Dress, and its life-support system was stated to be between the layers of a double-walled helmet. The spacesuits used in the Dan Dare scenario "Operation Saturn" by the villain Blasco are a different design and have small life-support backpacks. The Dan Dare stories also show various alien spacesuits.

Have Space Suit, Will Travel

Author Robert A. Heinlein's novel Have Space Suit—Will Travel (1958) drew both on these contemporary articles and on his experience designing pressure suits during World War II and featured a detailed description of a very realistic space suit with constant volume joints and fixed helmet and shoulder yoke, which was entered through a frontal gasketed zipper (similar to that in a drysuit).

Front cover illustrations (one shown here, one linked to in its caption) for the novel obviously inspired by contemporary diving apparatus show its life-support backpack as a correctly drawn old-type open-circuit two-cylinder aqualung as used for scuba diving with manifold and large round regulator and A-clamp. The artist avoided the error found in most comic-strip drawings of old-type aqualungs, of drawing each breathing tube coming directly from a cylinder top and no regulator. But to make this type of aqualung (as shown here) work in space, its regulator's existing perforated "wet-side" cover would have to be replaced by a sealed cover with a spring-loaded exit valve to keep a breathable pressure on the "wet" side of the regulator diaphragm. And the whole breathing system would have to be checked for leaks which would be harmless in scuba diving but would blow in space vacuum.
On the first image the breathing tubes run to a control panel on his chest, and the regulator can be seen. The image shows two spacesuits, whose helmets differ. One has a worklight on top; the other has two worklights, one on each side, and on top what is intended to represent a radio spike antenna and microwave horn antenna (two different antennas are also shown in a second book illustration, though the "microwave horn" antenna is incorrectly drawn attached by its wide end like an animal horn, instead of the correct musical-horn-like shape of a microwave horn antenna).
On the second image the breathing tubes run to each side of the "chin" of his helmet, and the regulator is hidden behind his head.

The spacesuits in these drawings differ much, but all depict the helmet base as being wide enough for the wearer to get it on over his head, showing that their artists had paid little attention to the writer's detailed descriptions.

In a description of the spacesuit Heinlein appears to be confused about the various effects of oxygen toxicity and bends and nitrogen narcosis.

Heinlein's description of pressure regulation came very close to the experience of astronauts in the Apollo program. His characters preferred to keep the pressure of their suits just high enough for survival, but not high enough to make it difficult to move around, much like the selected design pressure range of the real Apollo A7L suits.

The life support system of the suits in Have Space Suit—Will Travel was very similar to the backup Oxygen Purge System on the real Apollo Primary Life Support System, the only major difference being that the Apollo suits had a largely automatic pressure regulator, and Heinlein's suit had manual pressure regulation.

One major component of modern pressure suit Primary Life Support System backpacks which he missed was the lithium hydroxide canister which absorbs carbon dioxide from the air in the suit: see rebreather. Without this, his suit's breathing apparatus would have to be open circuit and limited to approximately two hours on a filling of oxygen or air, with the time varying according to exertion and cylinder size and his body size.

Another was the cooling system. He correctly recognised that overheating would be a major problem for the wearer of the suit. His cooling system was the same as the Apollo oxygen purge system: waste oxygen by letting it flow at a high rate and use it to dump heat. In practice, real suits used a water supply feeding a sublimator to provide cooling.

In The Cat Who Walks Through Walls the suits are strongly influenced by experience in the space program. He correctly describes a technique for helping an injured man in a pressure suit by decompressing the suit for less than a minute. Earlier books such as Rocket Ship Galileo described horrible injuries for people decompressed for short times.

In The Moon Is a Harsh Mistress Heinlein has people going onto the moon surface for about half a day in daylight and suffering from radiation exposure. In practice, overheating was the biggest risk of lunar surface operations, and cooling systems were easy to build.

Perry Rhodan
The front cover of the first issue of the German pulp science fiction series Perry Rhodan, published in 1961, shows a typical science-fiction open-circuit design with two large backpack cylinders instead of a modern life-support pack.

Armored space suits
Robert A. Heinlein's novel Starship Troopers (1959) famously featured armored power-assisted spacesuit-like battlesuits used in combat.  The suits are arguably one of the first examples of powered armor to be written of in American literature.  The Japanese anime OVA film Starship Troopers (1988) based on the novel also used powered armor suits inspired by Heinlein's example, but they appeared differently and incorporated built-in weaponry.  However, the 1997 film's interpretation did not use powered armor, much to the consternation of the book's fans.
The heroine of Nintendo's Metroid series of video games (1986–Present), Samus Aran, is another example of a character in fiction using an armored space suit. Known as the Power Suit, Samus' original suit is a modular powered armor, which can incorporate modular upgrades (such as "Varia" or "Gravity Suit") encountered during play. Although heavy damage obliges her to replace her space suit outright on two different occasions (specifically, in Metroid: Zero Mission and Metroid Fusion), Samus employs the Power Suit or one of its successors throughout all titles in the series.

Self-sealing and limb-constriction suits

In Ray Bradbury's short story "Kaleidoscope" (1949), used in The Illustrated Man (1951) occurs one of the first uses of self-sealing spacesuits which automatically tourniquet limbs to keep the wearer alive and pressurized, in cases of holes or amputations (in the story, occurring as a result of meteoroids in space).
A self-repair style of suit is briefly mentioned in Stand on Zanzibar (1968) by John Brunner. Spacesuits used by lunar explorers feature 'decompression sphincters' that clamp down and seal off any areas of a spacesuit that suffer damage. Repair patches or returning to the base must be achieved quickly before anhydrous gangrene destroys the area exposed to vacuum.
Joe Haldeman's novel The Forever War (1974) featured armored vacuum combat suits which were similar in principle but more advanced in design. Because the novel takes place over the timespan of several hundred years, the evolution of the battle suits can be observed and commented on by the lead character throughout with new features introduced — such as emergency hydraulic-powered joints which sever the limb of a soldier and inject anesthetics and blood plasma if enough damage is inflicted and a risk of decompression is apparent.

After first real space flights
After the establishment of NASA, and the first space missions, fictional spacesuits tended to follow real spacesuit design, including such features as a large rectangular backpack to hold life support components, except in low-budget science fiction movies and comics which were still inspired more by imagination than by reality.

2001: A Space Odyssey

This film by Stanley Kubrick was groundbreaking for its time and for decades later.  At the debut of 2001: A Space Odyssey, (1968) cosmonaut Alexei Leonov and astronaut Ed White had made space walks starting in 1965, followed by a handful of other astronauts, while the first lunar landing was still over a year in the future.  Thus space suits had been tested but not on the lunar surface.  In the film, space suits play notable roles several times, including in the lunar EVA when the monolith is inspected, and during different events in the journey aboard the Discovery One.  The design of the Space Odyssey helmets with a down-facing face plate and jutting top plate was (is) most strikingly different from both the actual 1960's designs including the Apollo lunar suit, and from the advancements in design seen in the decades leading to the real 2001.  Kubrick and co-author Arthur C. Clarke forecast rather optimistically that by 2001 there would be ongoing exploration and settlement of the moon and an advanced space construction program, and designs based on their speculations for 30 years later were bold but are still scientifically plausible.

Dune film
During the production of the spacesuits and stillsuits for the film Dune, the prop and costume designers stated a need to avoid "the standard outer-space stuff ... that sort of NASA look".

Gerry Anderson's UFO series

The Gerry Anderson's UFO series of the late 1960s/early 1970s features two types of spacesuit:
 Alien spacesuits, filled with a breathable liquid to resist acceleration stresses on the occupant.
 SHADO, Dalotek Corporation and Sovatex Corporation issue spacesuits.

The design of the alien spacesuits was revised during filming; in some episodes they are partly covered with bright metallic chainmail, and in some they are as per the image shown. The studio which made the series seems to have had only two alien spacesuit costumes. In the episode "Ordeal" where two aliens carry a human (Foster) who is in an alien spacesuit, one of the aliens has to be out of shot, or else 3 alien spacesuits would have been needed. The helmet splits into front and back halves to get it on over his head.

Space: 1999
In this other Anderson's series (a spin-off of UFO), spacesuits are orange and yellow with a white mechanical object on the torso of any astronaut and with an openable personalised helmet; often the episodes feature a recurring blooper: the astronaut's helmet is accidentally open.

Gundam
Spacesuits are commonly used in the Gundam anime media mix, but are often renamed to avoid confusion with space-use mobile suits. In the Universal Century timeline, spacesuits are called "normal suits"; the After Colony timeline calls them "astrosuit". Two types of spacesuit are frequently seen - as well as the more traditional bulky style, mobile suit pilots wear a thinner lighter suit, better designed for operating a mobile suit's controls. Gundam spacesuits often have a pouch full of adhesive strips, used to temporarily seal tears in the suit (as demonstrated in Mobile Suit Gundam) or cracks in the helmet (as demonstrated in Char's Counterattack).

Perry Rhodan
The German pulp science fiction series Perry Rhodan features a type of spacesuit known as a SERUN, for Semi-Reconstituent Recycling Unit. This suit contains advanced recycling systems that can provide the necessary oxygen, water, and food to keep the inhabitant alive for weeks. It also contains a sophisticated computerized medical treatment system, antigrav units for propulsion, and a generator for a defense screen.

Gravity 
The 2013 film Gravity, by Alfonso Cuarón with Sandra Bullock and George Clooney, was both appreciated and criticized for its use of space suits.  Besides objections to the unrestricted look of extravehicular activities was the lack of protective undergarments, displayed (not) by Bullock when she removed her suit—lacking critical items such as a liquid cooling and ventilation garment or socks.

Interstellar

In the 2014 film Interstellar, NASA uses futuristic spacesuits during the Lazarus missions and during Cooper and Brand's missions.  Cooper also uses a black spacesuit at the film's end.

Scorpion
In the episode "The Old College Try", to survive in subzero temperatures near a quantum computer, Walter wears an A7L spacesuit from the Apollo program.

Sylvester and Happy wears vintage spacesuits, too, but they are probably fictional (like the two characters themselves).

The Martian
In Andy Weir's 2011 novel The Martian, astronauts from the Ares missions use white spacesuits to walk on Mars' surface. The suits in the book are described as similar to the EMU suit.

Movie adaptation
Ridley Scott's 2015 adaptation of the novel features these suits:
Ares III spacesuit
Used by Watney during his period on Mars, this is a small orange and grey spacesuit, equipped with a GoPro-like suitcam, a vocal device which signals about malfunctions and a backpack.
Watney crashes his helmet during the explosion of the Hab, but it is replaced by another Ares III helmet (during the rest of the period of Mars) and an Ares IV helmet (during the spaceflight).
Hermes/Ares IV spacesuit
Used by the Hermes crew and projected also for the Ares IV one, is a specialized spacesuit used during the Mars-Earth and Earth-Mars spaceflights on NASA's Hermes spacecraft.
Commander Melissa Lewis also uses a Manned Maneuvering Unit (MMU) during the film's end.
Ares V spacesuit

Used by Rick Martinez and the other Ares V astronauts during the end credits of the film, is another suit, seen only during the launch of the Ares V mission.

Skintight spacesuits 

The potential for greater mobility and simpler operation with a skintight spacesuit, generally referred to as a space activity suit or mechanical counterpressure suit, make this type of space suit an attractive choice for fiction, where flexibility of use can be a boon to plot development.
 
Some space story writers whose work mentions flexible skin-tight spacesuits include:
 
 The spacesuits in early Buck Rogers comics seem to be skintight.
 Jerry Pournelle, who has been extensively involved in analysis and design of space technology systems.  Pournelle envisions a layered design where the inner flexible suit can be overlain with various kinds of thermal protection or armor, for protection against meteoroids or space battle damage, in the same way a flak jacket protects the occupants of a warplane.  Skintight spacesuits first appeared in recent science fiction in Pournelle's novel Exiles To Glory in 1977.
 A. Bertram Chandler.
 Grant Callin's Saturnalia and A Lion on Tharthee feature 'micropore suits' which use minute gas bubbles in foam rather than mechanical tension to provide counterpressure in vacuum.
 Stephen Baxter's Manifold Trilogy, notably Manifold: Time, covers the technical aspects of using a skintight suit for short EVAs, including the need to don the suit without creasing to prevent embolisms.
 In Larry Niven's Known Space, skintights are the preferred type of spacesuit used by belters in the 22nd and 23rd century.  They often decorated them with elaborate (and expensive) torso paintings as a form of heraldry.  Pournelle's design in particular is featured in some of Niven's later Ringworld novels.
 Victor Koman in Kings of the High Frontier.
 Kim Stanley Robinson used suits called "Walkers" that work on a similar principle for Martian surface exploration in the Mars Trilogy novels.
 Roger Leloup in the adventures of Yoko Tsuno
 In Spider and Jeanne Robinson's novel Stardance (1979) they played a significant role.
 Skinsuits feature rather prominently in the Honorverse books by David Weber.
 In EA Games's Dead Space series, engineers and miners use an airtight suit called a RIG when working in the vacuum of space or an otherwise unsafe environment.
 In L. Neil Smith's novel The Venus Belt, the protagonist describes in some detail a skin-tight Smartsuit which is capable of furnishing not only life support in various types of hostile environments, but also limited medical treatment for the wearer.  The suit also functions as a powerful wearable computer, with the circuitry, displays, and controls integrated into the fabric of the suit.  In the novel, the suit is, as a matter of tradition, included in the price of a space-liner ticket to Ceres.  The character notes that a properly fitted Smartsuit leaves the wearer feeling "completely naked ... a testament to the makers' art". Most spacefarers live in their Smartsuits for indefinite periods, as the suit can handle waste management and hygiene for the wearer.
 In Elecia White's novel Pony Up, the protagonist utilized a next-generation NASA "skinsuit" during a protracted space walk.
 Steven Gould, in his 2013 novel Exo, the fourth in his Jumper series, centered the ambitions of his young protagonist, Cent, on the use of a mechanical counterpressure suit to allow her to teleport into space.

Symbionts
Spider and Jeanne Robinson's novel Starseed (the second volume of their Stardance trilogy) and John Varley's Eight Worlds universe both feature alien symbionts which act as living space suits, supplying their wearer with oxygen and recycling waste gases and deriving their energy from solar power. James Blish's novella How Beautiful With Banners features a spacesuit formed from the protein coat of a genetically modified virus. The suit is able to be controlled by small electrical impulses, supplied by a control box mounted on the wearer's belt.

Space fiction without prominent use of spacesuits 

In some space fiction, space suits are largely absent.  Spacesuits were seen only once in the original Star Trek TV series (1966–1969), in the episode "The Tholian Web", mostly due to television budget constraints.  They play a more significant part in several of the movies: Star Trek: The Motion Picture (1979), Star Trek II: The Wrath of Khan (1982), Star Trek: First Contact (1996), and several episodes of the TV series Star Trek: Voyager (1995–2001).  Space suits are far more frequently used in the prequel series Star Trek: Enterprise (2001–2005), though they also doubled as environmental-hazard suits.
 
Spacesuits appear in all the original Star Wars movies, but only used by pilots of fighter-type spacecraft.  Spacesuits used outside spacecraft occur in some Star Wars novels and comics.

Force fields instead of spacesuits
Some fiction scenarios, instead of spacesuits, have a personal force field which keeps a bubble of breathable atmosphere around the user. Examples are:
 The Flickinger field in Jack McDevitt's fiction: A Flickinger field projects just above the user's clothing except for an extended bubble in front of the face for breathability. They are primarily invisible but can be seen as a faint aura in the right light. It occurs in works featuring protagonist Priscilla Hutchins: the novels The Engines of God, Deepsix, Chindi, Omega, Odyssey, and Starhawk and the short story "Oculus" (2002).
 John Varley's Eight Worlds novels The Ophiuchi Hotline, Steel Beach and The Golden Globe feature 'null-field' suits whose mechanism replaces one of the user's lungs and in use generates a reflective force-field around the wearer.
 Life support belts appear in several Star Trek: The Animated Series episodes, including "Beyond the Farthest Star" and "The Slaver Weapon".
 The bubble around the boys' spacecraft in Explorers.
 The Vell-os in Escape Velocity Nova use telekinesis to hold bubbles of pressurised air around them to traverse space.
 Pee-wee's "new spring suit" in Heinlein's Have Space Suit—Will Travel (1958).

References

External links
 Atomic Rocket: Spacesuits: descriptions and many images of fictional spacesuits

Fictional technology
Fiction